Newport Bay may refer to:

Disney's Newport Bay Club, a hotel situated at the Disneyland Paris
Newport Bay (Maryland), an arm of Chincoteague Bay between the mainland of Worcester County, Maryland and Sinepuxent Neck
Upper Newport Bay, the relatively natural and marsh-like upper portion of a long coastal inlet in Southern California
Newport Back Bay, the inland delta in Newport Beach, California
Newport Bay (California), Lower Newport Bay formed by the Balboa Peninsula, the harbor of Newport Beach, California 
Newport Bay (Wales), on the Pembrokeshire coast.

See also
Newport Harbor (disambiguation)